The 1980 United States presidential election in Idaho took place on November 4, 1980. All fifty states and The District of Columbia were part of the 1980 United States presidential election. State voters chose four electors to the Electoral College, who voted for president and vice president.

Idaho was won by former California Governor Ronald Reagan (R) by a 41-point landslide. It is a reliably Republican state, and the last Democratic presidential candidate to carry the state was Lyndon Johnson in 1964, and even Johnson won by merely five thousand votes in a national landslide. With 66.46 percent of the popular vote, Idaho would prove to be Reagan's second strongest state after neighboring Utah.

Results

Results by county

See also
 United States presidential elections in Idaho
 Presidency of Ronald Reagan

References

Idaho
1980
1980 Idaho elections